Rajnesh Dhirendra Singh is a Fijian entrepreneur and engineer. He holds several positions in the regional and international Information and Communications Technology community including the Internet Society and IPv6 Forum, and is an active Internet advocate and speaker on Internet technologies.

Early life 
Singh was born in Suva, Fiji to Dhirendra and Pritam Singh and completed his secondary and tertiary education in Brisbane, Australia. He attended   The Kooralbyn International School and studied Microelectronic Engineering at Griffith University, majoring in Communications Systems, graduating with Honours in April 1995. He also holds qualifications in Automation and Control Systems as well as a range of industry accreditations.

Career 
Singh is the co-founder of Avonsys, an Information and Communications Technology outsourcing firm serving the US West Coast and Chief Operating Officer of PATARA, a private sector firm involved in Information and Communications Technology solutions serving the Pacific region. He also serves as a Consultant to the Internet Society  and is also involved with other companies and organisations including private equity and venture capital firms.

Singh is also a consultant to the United Nations Asia and Pacific Training Centre for Information and Communication Technology for Development (UN APCICT)  where he authored Module 4 of the Academy of ICT Essentials for Government Leaders.

In 2003 he was seconded to serve as Project Manager ICT for the 2003 South Pacific Games which were held in Suva, Fiji where PATARA was an Official Supplier and corporate sponsor.

Singh is a frequent speaker at regional and international events on topics related to the Internet and technology and has spoken at events such as Telecom Asia, PTC, eIndia, World Cyber Security Summit, Internet Governance Forum and INETs and divides his time between Suva, Fiji and Delhi, India.

Other activities 
Singh is past Chair  of ICANN's Asia Pacific Regional At-Large Organisation (APRALO).

Singh is past Chairman of the Pacific Islands Chapter of the Internet Society PICISOC.

He is the founding and President of the IPv6 Forum Pacific Islands IPv6ForumPacificIslands which is actively promoting the adoption and deployment of IPv6 to support the next generation Internet.

He is Director of the Pacific Internet Technology Centre pacificIT, which is focused on the use, research and advancement of the Internet and related ICT technology in the Pacific for socio-economic development, ICT4D and breaching the Digital Divide.

He is Co-ordinator  of the Dynamic Coalition on Access and Connectivity for Remote, Rural and Dispersed Communities under the Internet Governance Forum.

Singh also organised and chaired a Workshop at the inaugural Internet Governance Forum (IGF) Athens 2006 on ICTs to Achieve MDGs. More information on the workshop is available here . He was appointed an Internet Society (ISOC) Ambassador to the IGF Rio 2007 in Rio de Janeiro, Brazil and was involved with several workshops. At IGF 2008 in Hyderabad, India he was a panellist in the main Access session where he offered comments on reaching the next billions of Internet users. He was also a panelist in workshops during IGF 2009 in Sharm el-Sheikh, Egypt.

In 2006, Singh was instrumental in establishing the UNDP/APDIP International Open Source Network IOSN Open Source Centre of Excellence in the Pacific Islands (IOSN-PIC).

He was a member of the ICT group for the 2003 South Pacific Games Organising Committee.

Since 2002, he has participated in the organisation of PacINET, the annual PICISOC conference and served as the Conference Chair in 2005 and 2006, as well as the Chair of the Papers Committee. More recently he has been involved in the organisation of the Internet Society's INET series of conferences in Asia

References

External links

Fijian engineers
Fijian businesspeople
Businesspeople from Hyderabad, India
Internet Society people
Fijian Sikhs
Living people
Griffith University alumni
People from Suva
Indian chief operating officers
Year of birth missing (living people)